Jake Bible (born Jacob David Bible) is an American science fiction and horror fiction author. He was nominated in 2015 for the Bram Stoker Award in the category of Superior Achievement in a Young Adult Novel (Intentional Haunting, Permuted Press).

Bible is the author of the Apex Trilogy, Z-Burbia and other series and has published over thirty novels, other works and short stories. He is the host of professional writing podcast Writing in Suburbia.

Drabble
Jake Bible's use of the Drabble format (very brief fiction of 100 words) began as an "exercise in character and plot development." He then realized that individual drabbles could easily be moved "around to control pacing and timing of the narrative." In August 2009, Bible released the first episode of his podcast and the very first Drabble Novel called Dead Mech. In 2013, Dead Mech and the rest of the Apex Trilogy was picked up by Severed Press, an independent publisher of horror and science fiction. Bible continues his Drabble exercises on a weekly basis through his Friday Night Drabble Party.

Novels

*dates are based on the release of the Kindle version

Short stories
2018-04-19
|}
*dates are based on the release of the Kindle version
|-

References

External links
Official Site, run by the author
Writing in Suburbia podcast, hosted by the author
Jake Bible on GoodReads
Full Text of One Eye Watches the Road

American science fiction writers
American podcasters
Living people
Year of birth missing (living people)
American male novelists
21st-century American novelists
21st-century American male writers
People from Bellevue, Washington
Novelists from Washington (state)
American horror novelists